Live and More is an EP by British heavy metal band, Girlschool published only in Japan. It was released in 1982 by Victor Musical Industries to coincide with their first Japan tour. The EP includes 2 live tracks and 2 studio tracks.

Track listing

Credits 
 Kim McAuliffe – rhythm guitar, vocals
 Kelly Johnson – lead guitar, vocals
 Enid Williams – bass, vocals
 Denise Dufort – drums

References

External links 
 Official Girlschool discography

1982 EPs
Girlschool EPs
Victor Entertainment EPs
1982 live albums
Girlschool live albums
Victor Entertainment live albums
Live EPs